Evil Alien Conquerors is an American comedy science fiction film. Released in 2003, the film was directed by Chris Matheson, and follows two aliens who are sent to Earth to destroy mankind. When they arrive, they are unable to complete their mission. The two aliens befriend a fast food employee who helps them.

Plot
Two Evil Alien Conquerors are sent to Earth with the order to behead all humans within 48 hours. If they fail, they will be destroyed by Croker, a  giant.

Kenny (Michael Weston) witnesses the Evil Alien Conquerors, My-ik (Diedrich Bader) and Du-ug (Chris Parnell), as they arrive on Earth, literally falling out of the sky with their beheading swords. He offers them shelter at his home, which he shares with Ron, an unpleasant, oversexed infomercial producer.

The conquering duo have a chance to experience Earth culture, where they become friends with Kenny, develop a fondness for Smirnoff Ice and unexpectedly fall in love with two local women, who have a secret of their own. They begin to doubt what they were sent to do, but know they still must attempt to complete their impossible mission despite their lack of skill, any plan or experience.

The giant Croker then arrives to destroy the two inept conquerors and the rest of the Earth's population, but he shrinks down to normal size during transportation. Delusional enough to still believe he is a giant, he attempts to wreak havoc on the town, obviously without success.

Cast

External links
 
 
 

2003 films
2000s science fiction comedy films
American science fiction comedy films
Films about giants
2003 comedy films
Films with screenplays by Chris Matheson (screenwriter)
Alien invasions in films
Films directed by Chris Matheson (screenwriter)
2000s English-language films
2000s American films